The following is a list of National Collegiate Athletic Association (NCAA) Division I college golf individual statistics and records through the 2018 NCAA Division I Men's Golf Championship. The NCAA began sponsoring the national collegiate championship in 1939.  Before that year the event was conducted by the National Intercollegiate Golf Association.

Individual national championships

Individual records
Most individual championships: 3 
Ben Crenshaw, Texas (1971, 1972, 1973)
Phil Mickelson, Arizona State (1989, 1990, 1992)
Most consecutive individual championships: 3 
Ben Crenshaw, Texas (1971–1973)
Lowest score (in relation to par), one round: 60 (−10) 
Michael Schachner, Duke, (2007, third round)
Lowest score (in relation to par), two rounds: 128 (−16)
Phil Mickelson, Arizona State (1992)
Lowest score (in relation to par), three rounds: 196 (−20)
Charles Howell III, Oklahoma State (2000) 
Lowest score (in relation to par), four rounds: 265 (−23)
Charles Howell III, Oklahoma State (2000)

References

External links
NCAA Men's Golf

College golf in the United States
Golf records and rankings